Rouslan Borysovych Bodelan (born 4 April 1942 in Berezivka village, Podilsk Raion, Odesa Oblast) is a Soviet and Ukrainian politician.

Biography

Soviet times

Rouslan Bodelan started his career in 1959 as a sports coach/teacher in a secondary school. In 1961 he began his work at the "Odessilbud" construction company (within its Construction and Field Assembly Department #14) in Balta.

Since 1964 Bodelan is active in politics, being member and functionary in Komsomol, Communist Party of the Soviet Union and other Soviet organizations. In 1965, he became a First Secretary (Head) of Kiliia Raion Komsomol Organization. His top position in CPSU was the First Secretary of Odesa Regional Committee, which he occupied in April 1990.

Career in independent Ukraine
On 3 April 1990 Bodelan was elected member of the Odesa Oblast Soviet (council). He was later elected a chairman of this council and was occupying this position up to April 1998. Simultaneously, Bodelan was a head of Odesa Oblast State Administration (i.e. governor) in July 1995 – May 1998, member of the Verkhovna Rada (parliament) of Ukraine in 1994–1998, a member of Maritime Policy Commission under President of Ukraine in 1995–1998, head of the Commonwealth of Danube States' Executive Group in 1996–1997.

In August 1998 Bodelan was elected a mayor of Odesa city. He was re-elected as mayor in 2002, but election results were challenged in courts. In 2005 an Odesa court ruled the elections void and proclaimed Eduard Gurvits a legal Mayor of Odesa.

While mayor Bodelan allegedly took active part in a wide-range electoral fraud in favor of pro-government candidates during the 2004 presidential election. After the Orange Revolution he fled to Russia. An investigation of his mayoral activities was opened soon after, Bodelan was charged with abuse of office.

Immigration and return

Bodelan is currently wanted under an Interpol search warrant, but Russian authorities refuse to extradite him. He was granted Russian citizenship in 2006 (which automatically revokes his Ukrainian citizenship) and a position of deputy director of the Saint Petersburg Sea Port. Bodelan refused to return to Ukraine voluntarily, claiming he is afraid of political prosecution by supporters of former president Viktor Yushchenko. On 9 April 2010 the ex-mayor returned to Odesa.

Awards
Rouslan Bodelan was awarded with a number of Soviet and Ukrainian decorations and medals, including Order of the Red Banner of Labour, "Decoration of Honour" Order, Order of Merits III grade, order of St. Volodymyr II grade.

See also
List of mayors of Odesa, Ukraine

References

External links 
  

 	 

1942 births
Living people
People from Odesa Oblast
Central Committee of the Communist Party of the Soviet Union members
Communist Party of Ukraine (Soviet Union) politicians
Politicians of the Ukrainian Soviet Socialist Republic
First convocation members of the Verkhovna Rada
Second convocation members of the Verkhovna Rada
Recipients of the Order of Merit (Ukraine), 2nd class
Recipients of the Order of Merit (Ukraine), 3rd class
Recipients of the Order of the Red Banner of Labour
Mayors of Odesa
Governors of Odesa Oblast
Heads of government who were later imprisoned
Ukrainian emigrants to Russia